Route 287 is a Connecticut state highway in the southern Hartford suburbs, running from Newington to Wethersfield. It serves the community of Griswoldville in Wethersfield.

Route description
Route 287 begins as East Robbins Avenue at an intersection with Route 176 in Newington. Route 287 soon crosses into Wethersfield, passing by the Wethersfield Country Club in the Griswoldville neighborhood. Route 287 ends at an intersection with Route 3 near Old Wethersfield.

The section of Route 287 in Wethersfield is designated the Bohdan "Bo" Kolinsky Memorial Highway.

History
Route 287 was established from previously unsigned state roads, SR 544 (Prospect Street) and SR 760 (Robbins Avenue), in 1969. However, it was not included in the official state highway map until 1975 because part of the route had been in arbitration with the town of Newington.  It has had no significant changes since.

Junction list

References

External links

287
Transportation in Hartford County, Connecticut